Paul Verhoeven (born 18 July 1938) is a Dutch filmmaker. His blending of graphic violence and sexual content with social satire is a trademark of both his drama and science fiction films. 

After receiving attention for the TV series Floris in his native Netherlands, Verhoeven got his film breakthrough with romantic drama Turkish Delight (1973), starring frequent collaborator Rutger Hauer. The film was nominated for Academy Award for Best Foreign Film and later received the award for Best Dutch Film of the Century at the Netherlands Film Festival. Verhoeven later directed successful Dutch films including the period drama Keetje Tippel (1975), the war film Soldier of Orange (1977), the teen drama Spetters (1980) and the psychological thriller The Fourth Man (1983). 

In 1985, Verhoeven made his first Hollywood film Flesh and Blood and later had a successful career in the United States, directing science fiction films such as RoboCop (1987), Total Recall (1990), Starship Troopers (1997) and Hollow Man (2000), as well as the erotic thriller Basic Instinct (1992).

He later returned to Europe, making the Dutch war film Black Book (2006), French psychological thriller Elle (2016), and the religious drama Benedetta (2021), all receiving positive reviews. Black Book and Elle were both nominated for BAFTA Award for Best Film Not in the English Language and Elle won Golden Globe Award for Best Foreign Language Film and César Award for Best Film. Black Book was also voted by the Dutch public, in 2008, as the best Dutch film ever made. In contrast, he won the Golden Raspberry Awards for Worst Picture and Worst Director for Showgirls (1995); he is one of the few people to have accepted their Golden Raspberry awards in person, and was the first person to go to the ceremony to receive it. Showgirls was a notorious box office flop at its initial theatrical release, but later enjoyed huge success in the home video market and became a cult classic. Verhoeven's films altogether received a total of nine Academy Award nominations, mainly for editing and effects.

Early life
Paul Verhoeven was born in Amsterdam on 18 July 1938, the son of a schoolteacher, Wim Verhoeven, and a hatmaker, Nel van Schaardenburg. His family lived in the village of Slikkerveer.

In 1943, the family moved to The Hague, the location of the German headquarters in the Netherlands during World War II. The Verhoeven house was near a German military base with V1- and V2-rocket launchers, which was repeatedly bombed by Allied forces. Their neighbours' house was hit and Verhoeven's parents were almost killed when bombs fell on a street crossing. From this period, Verhoeven mentioned in interviews, he remembers images of violence, burning houses, dead bodies on the street, and continuous danger. As a small child, he experienced the war as an exciting adventure, and has compared himself with the character Bill Rowan in Hope and Glory (1987).

Verhoeven's father became headteacher at the Van Heutszschool in The Hague, and Paul attended this school. Sometimes the two watched informative films at home with the school's film projector. Verhoeven and his father also liked to see American films that were shown in cinemas after the liberation, such as The Crimson Pirate (1952).

Verhoeven and his father went ten times to see The War of the Worlds (1953). Verhoeven was a fan of the Dutch comic Dick Bos. The character Dick Bos is a private detective who fights crime using jujutsu. Verhoeven liked comic drawing; he created The Killer, a character in a detailed story of revenge. Other fiction he liked included Frankenstein and the Edgar Rice Burroughs Barsoom series.

Verhoeven attended public secondary school Gymnasium Haganum in The Hague. Later, beginning in 1955, he studied at Leiden University. He graduated with a doctorandus (MSc) with a double major, in Mathematics and Physics.

Career

Short films and TV series (1960–1969)
Verhoeven made his first film Één hagedis teveel ("One Lizard Too Many") for the anniversary of his students' corps in 1960. In his last years at university Verhoeven also attended classes at the Netherlands Film Academy. After this he made three more short films: Nothing Special (1961), The Hitchhikers (1962) and Let's Have a Party (1963).

Verhoeven has not professionally used his mathematics and physics degree, opting instead to invest his energies in a career in film. After his studies, he entered the Royal Dutch Navy as a conscript. He made the documentary Het Korps Mariniers ("The Marine Corps", 1965), which won the French 'Golden Sun' award for military films.

 
When he left the Navy, Verhoeven took his skills to Dutch television. First, he made a documentary about Anton Mussert titled Mussert (1968). His first major success was the 1969 television series Floris, starring Rutger Hauer in the title role. The concept of Floris was inspired by foreign series such as Ivanhoe and Thierry La Fronde.

First feature films (1969–1983)
Verhoeven's first feature film Business Is Business was released in 1971 and was not well received. His first national success came in 1973 with Turkish Delight, starring Rutger Hauer and Monique van de Ven. Based on a novel by bestselling Dutch author Jan Wolkers, Turkish Delight tells the passionate love story of an artist and a young liberal girl from a conservative background. It received an Academy Award nomination for Best Foreign Language Film in 1974. In 1999, the film won a Golden Calf for Best Dutch Film of the Century. Katie Tippel (1975) again featured Hauer and van de Ven, but it did not match the success of Turkish Delight.

Verhoeven built on his reputation and achieved international success with the Golden Globe-nominated Soldier of Orange (1977), starring Rutger Hauer and Jeroen Krabbé. Based on a true story about the Dutch resistance in World War II, it was written by Erik Hazelhoff Roelfzema. Soldier of Orange received the 1979 LA Film Critics Award for best foreign-language film, and it was also nominated for a Golden Globe in 1980.

In 1980, Verhoeven made Spetters with Renée Soutendijk and Rutger Hauer. The story is sometimes compared to Saturday Night Fever, but it has more explicit violence and sexuality (in this case also homosexuality), which are sometimes seen as the director's trademarks. The Fourth Man (1983) is a horror film starring Jeroen Krabbé and Renée Soutendijk. It was written by Gerard Soeteman from a novel by the Dutch writer Gerard Reve, and was Verhoeven's last Dutch production until Black Book (2006).

The Seattle Times praised Verhoeven by saying he "often appears to be a one-man Dutch movie industry". The San Diego Union-Tribune called Verhoeven "a busy bee whose movies pollinate the festival circuit".

Filmmaking in the United States (1983–2000)
Gerard Soeteman also wrote the script for Verhoeven's first English-language film, Flesh and Blood (1985), which starred Rutger Hauer and Jennifer Jason Leigh. Verhoeven moved to Hollywood for a wider range of opportunities in filmmaking. Working in the U.S., he made a serious change in style, directing big-budget, violent, special-effects-heavy hits RoboCop (1987) and Total Recall (1990)⁠ — each of which won an Academy Special Achievement Award: RoboCop for Sound Effects Editing and Total Recall for Visual Effects.

Verhoeven followed those successes with the equally intense and provocative Basic Instinct (1992), an erotic thriller. The ninth-highest-grossing film of the year, the movie was a return to themes Verhoeven had explored in Turkish Delight and The Fourth Man. The film's most notorious scene shows Sharon Stone's character in a police interrogation, where she uncrosses her legs, briefly revealing her vulva (she does not wear underwear underneath her skirt). The film received two Academy Award nominations, for Film Editing and for Original Music.

During this time, Verhoeven also worked on creating an historical epic based around the Crusades that would have starred Arnold Schwarzenegger. It went into pre-production in 1993, but a year later the studio backing it, Carolco, pulled funding for the project. Verhoeven would continue to discuss it throughout the 1990s.

Verhoeven's next film was the poorly received, NC-17-rated Showgirls (1995), about a stripper in Las Vegas trying to make a career as a showgirl. It won seven Golden Raspberry Awards, including Worst Film and Worst Director; Verhoeven became the first director to accept his award in person. Showgirls enjoyed a large amount of success on the home video market, generating more than $100 million from video rentals, and became one of MGM's top twenty all-time bestsellers.

After Basic Instinct and Showgirls Verhoeven returned to the science fiction genre, utilizing the graphic violence and special-effects tropes that had marked his earlier films, making Starship Troopers (1997), loosely based on the novel of the same name by Robert A. Heinlein, and Hollow Man (2000). Each film received an Academy Award nomination for Best Visual Effects.

Return to Europe (2006–2021)
After about twenty years of working and living in the United States, Verhoeven returned to the Netherlands for the shooting of a new film. Together with his screenwriter Gerard Soeteman, Verhoeven made Black Book (2006). The director was hailed by the host of the Netherlands Film Festival with the words "The return of a hero". Black Book won six Golden Calves at this festival, including Best Director. When the shooting of Black Book was delayed due to financial issues, there was speculation about a new production. Beast of Bataan had been announced, but once the shooting for Black Book resumed, the other film was not made.

Verhoeven was knighted in the Order of the Netherlands Lion in 2007.

Since Black Book, Verhoeven has been connected to a large number of projects, but in the first decade after his return, none came to fruition. Some of those titles were produced with other directors at the helm, such as The Paperboy. In 2016, however, Verhoeven followed Black Book by directing a French film: Elle, an adaptation of a novel by Philippe Djian. A psychological thriller where Isabelle Huppert plays a rape victim, Elle was selected for the Official Competition at the Cannes International Film Festival, where it obtained very favourable reviews.

In December 2016, it was announced that Verhoeven would be the president of the jury for the 67th Berlin International Film Festival, scheduled to take place in February 2017.

In April 2017, it was announced that filming of Benedetta, his next French film, would begin in August of the same year. It is a biopic about the life of Benedetta Carlini, portrayed by Elle co-star Virginie Efira, and is an adaptation of the non-fiction book Immodest Acts: The Life of a Lesbian Nun in Renaissance Italy by Judith C. Brown. In May 2018, it was announced that Charlotte Rampling would play a key supporting role. The film premiered at the 2021 Cannes Film Festival in competition for the Palme d'Or.

Return to filmmaking in the United States (2022–)
Verhoeven is currently preparing his next film, which reunites him with RoboCop screenwriter Edward Neumeier. Young Sinner is an erotic political thriller set in Washington DC about a "young staffer who works for a powerful Senator [and] is drawn into a web of international intrigue and danger."

Other activities
Verhoeven was a member of the Jesus Seminar, and he was the only member who does not have a degree in biblical studies. He graduated with a degree in mathematics and physics from the University of Leiden. Since he is not a professional biblical exegete, his membership in the Jesus Seminar has occasionally been cited by opponents of the Seminar as a sign that this group is less scholarly than it claims. For example, Luke Timothy Johnson criticizes the Jesus Seminar's methods on exegetical grounds, and also criticizes what he perceives to be a dependence on the theatrical and an attempt to manipulate the mainstream media. He singles out Verhoeven as a key player in the media activities of the Jesus Seminar. On the other hand, some Jesus Seminar members were unhappy with Verhoeven's portrayal of Jesus as an eschatological prophet.

In 2007, Verhoeven wrote the book Jesus of Nazareth about the life of Jesus of Nazareth. The book reviews the ideas of Jesus of Nazareth and the alleged corruption of these same ideas over the last 2,000 years. Co-written with Verhoeven's biographer Rob Van Scheers, the book is the culmination of the research Verhoeven conducted in preparation for Jesus: The Man, a motion picture about the life of Christ. The book tells about the Jewish uprising against Roman rule and characterizes Jesus as a radical political activist, downplaying any supernatural events and miracles as unproved or unprovable. Jesus of Nazareth: A Realistic Portrait was released in September 2008 in Dutch, and was published in English in May 2010 by Seven Stories Press.

Personal life
In 1967, Verhoeven married Martine Tours, with whom he has two daughters: Claudia (b. 1972) and Helen (b. 1974).

Filmography

Awards and nominations
Academy Awards

Golden Globe Awards

BAFTA Awards

César Awards

Saturn Awards

Golden Raspberry Awards

References

External links

 
 
 

1938 births
20th-century Dutch male writers
21st-century Dutch male writers
Action film directors
Best Director Lumières Award winners
Dutch critics
Dutch documentary film directors
Dutch documentary film producers
Dutch documentary filmmakers
Dutch expatriates in the United States
Dutch film directors
Dutch film producers
Dutch male screenwriters
Dutch screenwriters
Dutch television critics
Dutch television directors
Dutch television producers
French-language film directors
German-language film directors
Golden Calf winners
Knights of the Order of the Netherlands Lion
Leiden University alumni
Living people
Male television writers
Royal Netherlands Navy personnel
Science fiction film directors
Video game producers
Mass media people from The Hague
Members of the Jesus Seminar
Postmodernist filmmakers